The flag that serves as the symbol of Rembertów, a quarter of the city of Warsaw, Poland is divided into four fields, that were of red and yellow colour, placed in the checkboard pattern. They are placed in two horizontal rows, with the fields on the left having the width of 1/3 of the flag width. The top left, and bottom right fields are yellow, while the top right, and bottom left fields, red.

The flag was adopted on 7 February 1996, as the flag of the gmina (municipality) of Warsaw–Rembertów. On 27 October 2002, the municipality had been replaced by the quarter of Rembertów, which continues to use the flag to the present day.

Design 
The flag of the Rembertów is divided into four fields, that were of red and yellow colour, placed in the checkboard pattern. They are placed in two horizontal rows, with the fields on the left having the width of 1/3 of the flag width. The top left, and bottom right fields are yellow, while the top right, and bottom left fields, red. The aspect ratio of the flag proportion of its height to its width, is 2:3 (1:1.5).

The colours are based on the yellow and red flag of Warsaw. In coat of arms and flag of Rembertów, the yellow colour symbolizes the sands of the dessert near Warsaw, and red symbolizes the blood of people who fought in Rembertów during World War II.

History 

The flag was adopted on 7 February 1996, as the flag of the gmina (municipality) of Warsaw–Rembertów. According to the illustration attached to the establishing law resolution, the aspect ratio of the flag proportion of its height to its width, was 2:3 (1:1.5), while, according to the municipal by-law, the proportions were 22:41 (1:1.86). On 27 October 2002, the municipality had been replaced by the city quarter of Rembertów, which continues to use the flag to the present day.

See also 
 list of flags of the districts of Warsaw
 flag of Warsaw

References 

Flag
Flag of Rembertow
Flag of Rembertow
Flags of cities in Poland
Flags of gminas of Poland
Flags introduced in 1996
Flag of Rembertow